Beaver Lake was a small lake or beaver pond formerly found on the Devils River in what is now Val Verde County, Texas. It was located about 19 miles north of second crossing of Devil's River and 44 miles from Howard Springs.

History
Beaver Lake was first encountered upstream of the head of Devil's River by the 1849 U. S. Army military expedition that established the San Antonio-El Paso Road. It was described by Robert A. Eccleston, one of a party of forty-niners traveling with the expedition. In Eccleston's diary of that trip he writes about the lake they camped near from July 23–26, 1849, as:

a pretty little lake. There was however no path down to the water & the bank was very steep. My brother and I went fishing in the lake... He caught two catfish... There is a beaver dam on the lake close to our camp. No beavers have yet been seen.

It was 213 miles from San Antonio on the road, according to the topographical engineers with the expedition.

The Beaver Lake Ranch, located nearby to the north.

References

Bodies of water of Val Verde County, Texas
San Antonio–El Paso Road
San Antonio–San Diego Mail Line
Lakes of Texas
Stagecoach stops in the United States